Gurpartap Singh Mann is a member of the Punjab Public Service Commission (PPSC).

He remained Chief General Manager of the Punjab Infrastructure Development Board, India.

Born on 11 April 1968 at Batala, Gurpartap Singh Mann belongs to a prominent agricultural family from Punjab; his father, S. Bhupinder Singh Mann, is a renowned and one of the most respected farmer's leader of the Bharti Kisan Union who remained Member of Parliament in Rajya Sabha from 1990 to 1996. S. Bhupinder Singh Mann plays an active role in raising social and economic issues faced by farming and rural communities. 

His family moved to settle in Batala during the partition in 1947 from Lyallpur (now Faisalabad,  http://wikimapia.org/street/17362038/en/chak-No-207-RB-ANOOP-SINGH-WALA). S. Anoop Singh, his grandfather was a very prominent figure in pre-partition Punjab and was a big landlord. Chak 207 at Faisalabad is still named after him.

His early schooling was from Baring School and Baring Union Christian College at Batala. He did his Engineering in Mechanical from Guru Nanak Dev Engineering College at Ludhiana. He did MBA from Punjab University. He worked in Swaraj Engines, Punjab State Industrial Development Corporation and then moved on to join Punjab Infrastructure Development Board (PIDB). He was one of the founding employees who structured and established the important organisation, which creates Infrastructure projects through public/private partnerships. He has to his credit about 50 such projects.

He quit the organisation in December 2010 from the Post of Chief General Manager after having served in PIDB for more than 11 years.

He is now involved in social work and is passionate about the cause of farmers.

He was actively involved with Indian National Congress till he was nominated as member of PPSC. He remained Secretary and Chairman of Social Media Cell of Punjab Congress. He was Chief Spokesperson of Congress party. He was also instrumental in drafting the manifesto of Punjab Congress during Vidhan Sabha elections 2017 as member of the Manifesto Committee along with Mrs Rajinder Kaur Bhattal and S. Manpreet Singh Badal. http://www.uniindia.com/punjab-congress-gives-final-touches-to-party-manifesto-for-assembly-polls/states/news/667328.html https://timesofindia.indiatimes.com/city/chandigarh/Amarinder-Bhattal-Manpreet-get-key-posts-in-Congress-poll-panel/articleshow/55256556.cms

He has been nominated as a Member of Punjab Public Service Commission in March 2018 (www.ppsc.gov.in)

References

12. http://indianexpress.com/article/india/india-news-india/punjab-assembly-polls-capt-forms-team-to-study-states-issues/

13. http://timesofindia.indiatimes.com/city/chandigarh/Gurpartap-Singh-Mann-appointed-as-chairman-of-the-social-media-cell-of-PPCC/articleshow/47253353.cms

14. http://sugarnews.in/punjab-congress-announces-dharnas-against-private-sugar-mills/

15. http://punjabnewsexpress.com/punjab/news/capt-amarinder-finalise-names-of-ppsc-members-information-commissioners-for-submission-to-governor-72778.aspx

16. http://www.tribuneindia.com/news/punjab/govt-names-ppsc-members-khaira-calls-it-arbitrary/548233.html

17. https://timesofindia.indiatimes.com/city/chandigarh/6-names-recommended-for-ppsc-2-for-state-information-commissioners/articleshow/63035806.cms

Further reading
  
 
 
 

1968 births
Living people
Engineers from Punjab, India
People from Gurdaspur district